Markha may refer to:
                          
 Markha, a former village, incorporated into the city of Yakutsk, Sakha Republic, Russia
 Markha, Olyokminsky District, a village in Olyokminsky District, Sakha Republic, Russia
 Markha (Vilyuy), a tributary of the Vilyuy in the Sakha Republic, Russia
 Markha (Lena), a tributary of the Lena in the Sakha Republic, Russia
 Markha River (India), a river in Ladakh, India